Macellibacteroides fermentans  is a non-spore-forming, obligately anaerobic, rod-shaped and mesophilic bacterium from the genus of Macellibacteroides which has been isolated from an upflow anaerobic filter fore treating abattoir wastewaters in Tunisia.

References

External links 
Type strain of Macellibacteroides fermentans at BacDive -  the Bacterial Diversity Metadatabase

Bacteroidia
Bacteria described in 2012